is a Japanese actress, tarento, and former gravure idol from Tokyo who has appeared in television series, feature films and stage productions.

Filmography

Films

Direct-to-video

Television

TV dramas

Radio

Stage

Advertisements

Released works

Photo albums

DVD

References

External links
 – Office Zan 
 – Ameba Blog 
 
Idol Report Maya Koizumi – "Sponichi Annex" content 
GREE Gradol Harem (video game appearance) 

Japanese actresses
Japanese gravure idols
People from Tokyo
1988 births
Living people